McInally is an Irish surname. Notable people with the surname include:

Alan McInally (born 1963), Scottish footballer and pundit
Charlie McInally (born 1939), Scottish footballer
Damian McInally (born 1975), Australian rugby union player
Jackie McInally (1936–2016), Scottish footballer
Jim McInally (ice hockey) (born 1948), Canadian ice hockey player
Jim McInally (born 1964), Scottish footballer and manager
John McInally (disambiguation), multiple people
Pat McInally (born 1953), American football player
Stuart McInally (born 1990), Scottish rugby union player
Tommy McInally (1899–1955), Scottish footballer
Hamilton McInally (1876-1950), Scottish Golfer